Helga Vieira (born 8 July 1980) is a Portuguese female tennis player.

Vieira has won two singles titles on the ITF tour in her career. On 16 July 2001, she reached her best singles ranking of world number 371. On 25 June 2001, she peaked at world number 394 in the doubles rankings.

In 2000 she represented Portugal in the Fed Cup.

ITF finals (2–2)

Singles (2–1)

Doubles (0–1)

Fed Cup participation

Singles (1–1)

Doubles (1–0)

ITF Junior Finals

Singles Finals (0–1)

Doubles finals (2–2)

References

External links 
 
 
 

1980 births
Living people
Angolan female tennis players
Angolan people of Portuguese descent
Portuguese female tennis players